William Howard (1538–1600), of Lingfield, Surrey, was an English politician.

He was a Member (MP) of the Parliament of England for Reigate in 1559, 1563, 1571, 1572, 1584, 1586, 1589, 1593 and 1597.

References

1538 births
1600 deaths
People from Surrey
English MPs 1559
English MPs 1563–1567
English MPs 1571
English MPs 1572–1583
English MPs 1584–1585
English MPs 1586–1587
English MPs 1589
English MPs 1593
English MPs 1597–1598